Anne Maree Judkins (born 1 March 1964) is a retired female track and field athlete from New Zealand who specialised in racewalking.

Judkins was born in 1964. Her uncle is Robin Judkins, a retired sports administrator from Christchurch. She received her secondary school education at Tikipunga High School.

She competed for New Zealand in the 1990 Commonwealth Games, winning a silver in the 10,000m road walk. In the 1992 Summer Olympics she came 9th in the 10 km road with a time of 45m 28s. Judkins was awarded the New Zealand 1990 Commemoration Medal.

Achievements

References

Athletes at the Games by John Clark, page 61 (1998, Athletics New Zealand)   
Profile at NZOGC website

1964 births
Athletes (track and field) at the 1990 Commonwealth Games
Athletes (track and field) at the 1992 Summer Olympics
Commonwealth Games silver medallists for New Zealand
Commonwealth Games medallists in athletics
Olympic athletes of New Zealand
Living people
New Zealand female racewalkers
Athletes from Auckland
People from Takapuna
Medallists at the 1990 Commonwealth Games